Hyam Plutzik (July 13, 1911 – January 8, 1962), a Pulitzer prize finalist,  was a poet and Professor of English at the University of Rochester.

Books 

The Three (Yale University Prize Poem, 1933). New Haven, Conn.: Yale University Press, 1933. (Pamphlet)
Death at the Purple Rim (Yale University Prize Poem, 1941). Brooklyn: The Artisan Press, 1941. 37pp
Aspects of Proteus, a book of poems. New York: Harper & Brothers, 1949. 94pp.
Apples from Shinar: A book of poems. Middletown, Conn.: Wesleyan University Press, 1959. 59pp.
Horatio. New York: Atheneum, 1961. 89pp.
Hyam Plutzik: The Collected Poems, with a foreword by Anthony Hecht. Brockport, N.Y..: BOA Editions, 1987. 313pp.
Apples from Shinar: Special Edition, with an afterword by David Scott Kastan. Middletown, Conn.: Wesleyan University Press, 2011. 74pp.
32 Poems / 32 Poemas. Bilingual (English-Spanish) edition with a foreword by  Richard Blanco. Miami: Suburbano Ediciones, 2021.

Periodicals 

Plutzik also published poems in the New York Times Sunday Book Review, Sewanee Review, Beloit Poetry Journal, Poetry-New York, Hopkins Review,  Epoch, Furioso, Prairie Schooner, Yale Review, American Scholar, Antioch Review, New World Writing, The Nation, Saturday Review, Voices, Transatlantic Review, the Christian Science Monitor, and Kenyon Review.

Awards 
Yale University: Prize Poem (J.S. Cook Award for “The Three”), 1933
Yale University: Prize Poem (J.S. Cook Award for “The Purple Rim”), 1941
National Institute of Arts and Letters: Award for accomplishment in lyric and narrative poetry. 1950
Poetry Awards Prize: for a Book of Verse (subsequently known as the Borestone Mountain Poetry Awards). Shared award with Rolfe Humphries. 1951
University of Rochester Summer Faculty Fellowship for Creative Writing. 1954
Ford Foundation Faculty Fellowship for study of science as background to modern poetry 1954–1955.
University of Rochester Summer Faculty Fellowship for Creative Writing. 1954
University of Rochester Summer Faculty Fellowship for Creative Writing. 1958
Lillian Fairchild Award (Rochester) for Best Work of Imagination. 1959
“Horatio” selected as a finalist for the Pulitzer Prize 1961
The city of Rochester declares May 11, 2002, Hyam Plutzik Day in recognition of his contributions to the community. “Sprig of Lilac” is noted as the official poem of the Lilac Festival.

References

External links 
 Hyam Plutzik Official Website

1911 births
1962 deaths
20th-century American poets
University of Rochester faculty
American male poets
Poets from New York (state)
20th-century American male writers